Jang Dong-hyun (born 13 January 1995) is a Korean handball player for SK Hawks and the Korean national team.

He represented Korea at the 2018 Asian Games, the 2019 World Men's Handball Championship and the 2023 World Men's Handball Championship.

References

1995 births
Living people
South Korean male handball players
Handball players at the 2018 Asian Games
Asian Games bronze medalists for South Korea
Asian Games medalists in handball
Medalists at the 2018 Asian Games
21st-century South Korean people